Independent Young Socialists ( or ) was a leftist youth group in Denmark.

The UUS was formed in 1995, when the left wing (essentially the Copenhagen branch) of the Youth of the Socialist People's Party (Danish: Socialistisk Folkepartis Ungdom or SFU) broke away.

After the group was virtually disintegrated it merged, in 1996, into the Danish group Rebel.

References

Political youth organizations based in Denmark
Socialism in Denmark